The Real Housewives of Athens (abbreviated RHOAthens) was a Greek reality television series that debuted on ANT1 on March 4, 2011 until May 27, 2011. Developed as the first international installment of the Real Housewives franchise, it aired only one season and documented the personal and professional lives of several women residing in Athens, Greece.

Overview and casting

The series chronicles the lives of six Greek women. The show aired in the midst of the Greek government-debt crisis and faced criticism for its tone of luxurious living in hard economic times. Writing after the show was cancelled, The New York Times commented that the show "barely lasted one season, and it doesn’t take long to see why. The Greek adaptation had a depressive undertone that might have matched the national mood, but didn’t provide viewers with a frothy escapist kick.  Wealthy Greeks aren’t flaunting their lifestyles these days..." The first season cast included Ioanna Soulioti, Orthoula Papadakou, Annita Nathanail, Fofi Mastrokosta, Christina Papa, and Joe Satratzemi Togou

The series was not subsequently renewed and remained a one-season series.

Taglines
Annita: "I live a magical life."
Christina: "I am born with a free spirit."
Fofi: "I want to live every moment of my life."
Ioanna: "The challenges excite me.”
Orthoula: "My independence is my power."

References

External links
 

2010s Greek television series
2011 Greek television series debuts
2011 Greek television series endings
Greek-language television shows
Television shows set in Athens
Athens
ANT1 original programming
Greek television series based on American television series
Women in Athens